Jackie's Warrior (foaled February 13, 2018) is a Champion American Thoroughbred racehorse who has won five Grade I events including the Hopeful Stakes at Saratoga, the Champagne Stakes at Belmont Park in 2020 and the H. Allen Jerkens Memorial Stakes at Saratoga (2021). Jackie's Warrior was awarded as Eclipse Award as American Champion Sprint Horse in 2021. In 2022 won the Grade I Churchill Downs Stakes and Alfred G. Vanderbilt Handicap at Saratoga.

Background
Jackie's Warrior is a bay colt that was bred in Kentucky by J & J Stables. His sire is  Maclean's Music and his dam is Unicorn Girl, a daughter from  A. P. Five Hundred, who was a winner of 19 races and an earner of $483,508. Jackie's Warrior was her third foal and first stakes winner. He was bought for $95,000 by J. Kirk Robison out of Taylor Made Sales Agency's consignment at the 2019 Keeneland September Yearling Sale. Jackie's Warrior was named by her breeders, Jennie and John Williams of J and J Stables in Florida, to honor Jennie's sister, Jackie Ross, a brain cancer survivor in remission. Jackie's Warrior is trained by Steven M. Asmussen and his jockey is Joel Rosario.

Racing career

2020: Two-year-old season
Jackie's Warrior began his career on 19 June at Churchill Downs in a maiden event for two-year-olds over a distance of five furlongs facing six other non-winners, of which only one had raced before. The more experienced Petit Verdot bounced out in front and from the 2 post Jackie's Warrior tracked the leader, then switch to the outside on the turn and in the straight a furlong from home cleared away to win by  lengths in a time of 57.49 seconds.

Trainer Steve Asmussen then pointed Jackie's Warrior towards the two-year-old stakes races at Saratoga. In his next start on 7 August, Jackie's Warrior led throughout, winning the Grade II Saratoga Special Stakes by three lengths. Jockey Joel Rosario commented after the race, "When they came to him, he wanted to go, and I felt even more confident at that point. I knew he had something left." After his second race J. Kirk Robison added his wife as part owner of Jackie's Warrior.

Four weeks later, Jackie's Warrior faced seven rivals in the Grade I Hopeful Stakes. Again he went to the lead and opened up a five-length lead over even-money favorite Reinvestment Risk in the straight before finishing over 2 lengths in front at the wire. Jackie's Warrior as the 9/5 second choice finished in a time of 1:21.29, which was a  stakes record.

Jackie's Warrior's next start was on 10 October in the Champagne Stakes at Belmont Park, where he faced five other entrants. Starting as the 17/20 odds-on favorite, he led Reinvestment Risk throughout and extended his lead in the straight to win his fourth straight race by  lengths in a time of 1:35.42. Regular jockey  Rosario said, “I was very confident that he could get the mile.  He just enjoyed what he was doing." Jackie's Warrior earned 10 points in qualification in the Road to the Kentucky Derby and emerged as the favorite for the Breeders' Cup Juvenile.

The Breeders' Cup Juvenile, held at Keeneland attracted a full field of 14, and Jackie's Warrior started as the 9/10 odds-on favorite.

From barrier 2, jockey Joel Rosario was not able to get to the lead from the start but had to settle and trail longshot Dreamer's Disease. Jackie's Warrior forged a path to the outside of Dreamer's Disease leaving the backstretch and hit the front to lead a by half-length. However, second favorite from midfield Essential Quality also moved four-wide towards the lead outside of Jackie's Warrior, passing the other leaders and winning. Jackie's Warrior finished fourth, beaten  lengths.

Jackie's Warrior finished a distant second to Essential Quality in the Eclipse Award for US Champion Two-Year-Olds.

2021: Three-year-old season
After a break of over three months, Jackie's Warrior resumed his career with the plan to qualify for the Kentucky Derby as an entrant in the Grade III Southwest Stakes at Oaklawn Park over  miles. Leading early, he tired in the straight, finishing a distant third to Essential Quality and Spielberg. Soon after, connections informed that Jackie's Warrior would be off the Kentucky Derby trail.

On Kentucky Derby Day, he started as the 23/10 favorite in an undercard event, the Grade II Pat Day Mile Stakes for three-year-olds over a mile. After leading, Jackie's Warrior held on strongly to hold off Dream Shake to win by a neck. Jockey Rosario commented after the race, "He likes when a horse comes up to him, and he really digs in. I was not worried about the fast early pace because he fights very hard down the stretch."

Jackie's Warrior's third start of the year was at Belmont Park in the Grade I Woody Stephens Stakes over seven furlongs where he faced five other three-year-olds. Again starting well and leading with fast fractions of 22.09 and 44.19, he seemed to have the race in hand but was beaten by Drain The Clock by a neck. According to his jockey, he stumbled out of the starting gate, which may have cost him the race.

After a two-month break, Jackie's Warrior returned to Saratoga, where he had success the previous season. Starting as the 1/2 odds-on favorite in the Grade II Amsterdam Stakes he defeated Drain the Clock by  lengths on a sloppy track.

Four weeks later in the Grade I H. Allen Jerkens Memorial Stakes, Jackie's Warrior met Life Is Good. Jackie's Warrior came from off the lead to win by a neck in a  fast time of 1:21.39. Life Is Good was making his first start after a 171-day layoff that included an operation.

On 25 September, Jackie's Warrior started in the Grade II Gallant Bob Stakes at Parx Racing in Bensalem. He was the 1/20 favorite and won by nearly seven length in a time of 1:08.64 for the six-furlong distance.

Jackie's Warrior’s last start of the year was in the Breeders' Cup Sprint at Del Mar on 6 November. Installed as the 1/2 favorite, he was quick out of the gate and clocked fractions of 21.91 and 44.11 while being pressed by Special Reserve and Matera Sky. In the straight, Jackie's Warrior tired to finish sixth in the field of nine.

The NTRA awarded him an Eclipse Award as American Champion Sprint Horse for 2021.

2022: Four-year-old season

Jackie's Warrior began his four-year-old campaign on 16 April in the Grade III Count Fleet Sprint Handicap at Oaklawn Park. On a sloppy sealed track Jackie's Warrior defeated five other foes in a time of 1:09.09.

On 7 May Jackie's Warrior ran in the Grade I Churchill Downs Stakes on Kentucky Derby Day. Starting brilliantly as the even-money favorite he led all the way in the seven horse field extending in the straight to a comfortable four-length victory in a time of 1:21.95.

On 10 June Jackie's Warrior faced five other entrants in the Grade II True North Stakes at Belmont Park. Starting as the overwhelming 1/4 odds on favorite Jackie's Warrior was bumped in the hindquarters at the start but was able to move forward and get to the lead and easily dispatched his foes winning by five lengths in a time of 1:15.09 with jockey Joel Rosario never asking him for his best and easing him up in the final 70 yards of the race.

In the Alfred G. Vanderbilt Handicap at Saratoga on July 30, Jackie's Warrior was assigned 127 pounds. Facing five other entrants Jackie's Warrior started as the overwhelming 1/4 odds-on favorite by the crowd of 37,476, made his opponents feeble as jockey Joel Rosario never moved a muscle cruised to the easiest of two-length wins in a time of 1:09.74. The margin could have been more had Rosario asked him for more.

Jackie's Warrior attempted his sixth career win at Saratoga in the Grade I Forego Stakes on August 27. Starting as the 3/20 odds-on favorite was upset by the 8/1 second favorite Cody's Wish by  lengths in a time of 1:20.95. Trainer Steven Asmussen said, "There's a little sadness that it's his last time to run at Saratoga because he's brought us so much fun and joy here. He'll be sharp for the (Grade I Breeders' Cup Sprint), which will be his next and last race."

On November 5, Jackie's Warrior ran his final career race in the Breeders' Cup Sprint at Keeneland. Starting as the 0.77 favorite Jackie's Warrior finished third to Elite Power.

Statistics

Notes:

An (*) asterisk after the odds means Jackie's Warrior was the post-time favourite.

Stud career
On retirement will begin his stud career at Spendthrift Farm in 2023. It was announced that Jackie's Warrior would stand his first season for a fee of $50,000.

Pedigree

References

2018 racehorse births
Racehorses bred in Kentucky
Racehorses trained in the United States
Thoroughbred family 4-n
American Grade 1 Stakes winners